The Serasa class is a ship class of two light landing craft. Both were laid down by Transfield Shipbuilding for the Royal Brunei Navy in the August 1996. The lead ship is KDB Serasa. Currently both ships are in active service in support of Royal Brunei Land Forces. Both ships were commissioned together on 7 May 1997 at Muara Naval Base, Brunei. They are sometimes used to transport supplies, vehicles and personal to specific locations where they are needed.

Ship in class

References 

Royal Brunei Navy
Amphibious warfare vessels
Landing craft